The Raid on Cuxhaven (Christmas Raid) was a British ship-based air-raid on the Imperial German Navy at Cuxhaven mounted on Christmas Day, 1914.

Aircraft of the Royal Naval Air Service were carried to within striking distance by seaplane tenders of the Royal Navy, supported by both surface ships and submarines. The aircraft flew over the Cuxhaven area and dropped their bombs, causing damage to shore installations.

It was described at the time as an "air reconnaissance of the Heligoland Bight, including Cuxhaven, Heligoland and Wilhelmshaven ... by naval seaplanes" during which "the opportunity was taken of attacking with bombs points of military importance" in northern Imperial Germany.

Planning
The objective was to reconnoitre military installations in the area and if possible, bomb the Zeppelin sheds at Cuxhaven. Lieutenant Erskine Childers RNVR, the yachtsman and author of Riddle of the Sands, who had sailed the area before the war, provided the navigational briefing and accompanied Flight Commander Cecil Kilner as navigator and observer.

Raid
On Christmas Day, 1914, the first combined sea and air strike was executed by the Royal Navy, aimed at locating and if possible bombing the dirigible sheds housing German Zeppelins, to forestall attacks by the airships on Britain. The air temperature was just above 0 °C and of the nine seaplanes lowered to the water, only seven (three Short Improved Type 74 "Folders", two Short Type 81 Folders and two Short Type 135 Folders, all carrying three  bombs) were able to start their engines and take off. Those unable to take part, a Short Type 81 (serial no. 122) and a Short "Improved Type 74" (serial no. 812), were winched back on board.

Fog, low cloud and anti-aircraft fire prevented the raid from being a complete success, although several sites were attacked. Nevertheless, the raid demonstrated the feasibility of attack by ship-borne aircraft and showed the strategic importance of this new weapon. According to a telegram dated 7 January 1915, held in the "Churchill Archives Centre", at Churchill College, Cambridge, the "Admiralty Chief Censor intercepted message from Hartvig, Kjobenhaven to the Daily Mail, reporting that the British aerial raid on Cuxhaven [Germany] had forced the German Admiralty to remove the greater part of the High Seas Fleet from Cuxhaven to various places on the Kiel Canal."

The crews of all seven aircraft survived the raid, having been airborne for over three hours. Three aircraft, a Short 'Improved Type 74' (RNAS serial no. 811, flown by Flt. Lt. Charles Edmonds), a Short Admiralty Type 81 (RNAS serial no. 119, Flt. Cdr. R. P. Ross), and a Short Admiralty Type 135 (RNAS serial no. 136, Flt. Cdr. C. F. Kilner with Lt. Erskine Childers as his observer), regained their tenders and were recovered; three others (one "Admiralty Type 81", RNAS serial no. 120, Flt. Lt. A. J. Miley, and two Short 'Improved Type 74' folders, RNAS serial nos. 814 (Flt. Sub-Lt. V. Gaskell-Blackburn) and 815 (Flt. Cdr. D. A. Oliver)) landed off the East Friesian island of Norderney and their crews were taken on board the submarine , under the command of Lieutenant-Commander Martin Nasmith (the aircraft being scuttled to prevent them from falling into enemy hands); the seventh aircraft, a Short Admiralty Type 135 (RNAS serial no. 135) piloted by Flt. Hewlett was posted as missing, but he was found by the Dutch trawler Marta van Hattem, which took him on board and returned him to the port of IJmuiden in the Netherlands, where he disembarked on 2 January 1915 whence he made his way back to Britain.

German reaction
After the raid there was no response by the German High Seas Fleet. By contrast, the  German naval arm was very active. Seaplanes and airships set out to discover the position of the attacking force. One reconnaissance seaplane, a  FF.19 (No. 85) stayed aloft for five hours 52 minutes, a remarkable achievement for the period. Another seaplane from Heligoland spotted the British but due to not having a wireless transmitter had to return to the island to report. Sighting was also made by the airship L6 but due to a generator failure reporting was not initially made.

The attacking force had been sailing in formation at a speed of  but due to boiler difficulties, this speed could not be made by HMS Empress, which lagged astern of the formation. Consequently, the first combat was against this vessel. Two  seaplanes attacked with bombs, and although one small bomb exploded only 20 feet off the bow, no damage was done to the ship or crew. The Zeppelin L6 followed by attacking with both bombs and machine gun fire. The crew of the Empress attempted to drive the Zeppelin away, initially with rifle fire as their 12-pounder in the stern was blanked by the superstructure. No damage was done to the ship, seaplanes or airship.

Further attacks on the retiring force were attempted by submarines U-20, U-22 and U-30 but the manoeuvres of the British Fleet prevented any success. The British force returned to home waters without loss or damage.

Aftermath

Analysis
The Cuxhaven raid was an imaginative endeavour, showing the willingness amongst naval and military leaders to adopt new technology and foreshadowed the air-sea battles of the future. It was a boost to British morale, and pointed the way to ways in which aircraft could be made more effective.

Decorations
For their part in the Cuxhaven Raid, Kilner and Edmonds were awarded the Distinguished Service Order (DSO); Chief Petty Officer Mechanic James William Bell and Chief Petty Officer Mechanic Gilbert Howard William Budds were awarded the Distinguished Service Medal (DSM).

Notes

References

Footnotes

Bibliography

External links

Nordholz
Conflicts in 1914
Military operations of World War I involving the United Kingdom
1914 in Germany
Aerial operations and battles of World War I
Naval aviation operations and battles
December 1914 events